The Rhine Falls (a singular noun) is a waterfall located in Switzerland and the most powerful waterfall in Europe. The falls are located on the High Rhine on the border between the cantons of Schaffhausen (SH) and Zürich (ZH), between the municipalities of Neuhausen am Rheinfall (SH) and Laufen-Uhwiesen/Dachsen (ZH), next to the town of Schaffhausen in northern Switzerland.

The falls cannot be climbed by fish, except by eels that are able to worm their way up over the rocks.

Geology

The Rhine Falls were formed in the last ice age, approximately 14,000 to 17,000 years ago, by erosion-resistant rocks narrowing the riverbed. The first glacial advances created today's landforms approximately 500,000 years ago. Up to the end of the Wolstonian Stage approximately 132,000 years ago, the Rhine flowed westwards from Schaffhausen past Klettgau. This earlier riverbed later filled up with gravel.

About 132,000 years ago the course of the river changed southwards at Schaffhausen and formed a new channel, which also filled up with gravel. Part of the Rhine today includes this ancient riverbed.

During the Würm glaciation, the Rhine was pushed far to the south to its present course, over a hard Late Jurassic limestone bed. As the river flowed over both the hard limestone and the easily eroded gravel from previous glaciations, formed the waterfall. The Rheinfallfelsen, a large rock, is the remnant of the original limestone cliff flanking the former channel. The rock has eroded very little over the years because relatively little sediment comes down the Rhine from Lake Constance.

The formation of the Rhine Falls is shown in a permanent exhibition at the Museum zu Allerheiligen in Schaffhausen.

Economics
The north side of the falls is a millsite. In the 17th century, a blast furnace for smelting iron ore found in the limestone was built. It was in operation until the first half of the 19th century.

In 1887 the ironworks applied for permission to divert between one fifth to one half of the river's flow for electricity generation. The Swiss Alpine Club, the Schweizerische Naturforschende Gesellschaft (a nature group) and several scientific societies opposed the plan.

In 1913 an international competition was held for the best plan for a shipping route between Basel and Lake Constance.

In 1919, a company wanting to build power stations in northern Switzerland were told that any such station at the Rhine Falls "must serve the economic interest of the public".

In 1944, the Swiss Council of States granted permission to build the proposed power station. The permission was to become effective on 1 February 1948, with construction to begin in 1952. But in 1951, the Neuen Helvetischen Gesellschaft (New Swiss Society), under the leadership of Emil Egli, got 150,000 Swiss citizens to sign a petition protesting the project; among the signatories were 49 famous citizens, including Hermann Hesse and Carl Jacob Burckhardt. The petition not only scuttled the power station project, but effectively prevented all future hydropower and navigation engineering projects on the upper Rhine to the present day.

Today, the falls are still under consideration for hydropower projects. If the full water flow were used, the power generated would average approximately 50 MW. The economic value of the falls as a tourist attraction may be greater.

Tourism
The nearest communities are Neuhausen am Rheinfall just north of the Rhine Falls, where tourists can also view the Wörth Castle (Swiss German: Schlössli Wörth), and Laufen-Uhwiesen, with the Laufen Castle (German: Schloss Laufen) overlooking the waterfall. Access to the other side of the river is possible through boat services or via a sidewalk on the railway bridge (Rheinfallbrücke) upstream of the waterfall.

Aside from boat tours to the Rhine Falls' rock (Rheinfallfelsen), there are also viewing platforms with views on the waterfall built on both sides of the Rhine River. These are reached via steep and narrow stairs (access by fee on the Schloss Laufen side). Elevators exist in some places. Guided tours of various lengths start from Laufen Castle on the Zürich side of the falls – a youth hostel is also located in Schloss Laufen. Various restaurants are located in Schloss Laufen, Schlössli Wörth and the Rheinfall park.

Transport 

Public transport in Switzerland is famous for its density and its coordination between services (trains, busses and boats) due to the clock-face schedule. There are several train stations near the Rhine Falls. Both stations are serviced by S-Bahn trains only. The town of Neuhausen has two additional S-Bahn railway stations,  and Neuhausen Badischer Bahnhof (Neuhausen Bad Bf), which are further away from the Rhine Falls. , the largest railway station in the area, is even farther away (ca. ), but can be reached by frequent bus services operated by Verkehrsbetriebe Schaffhausen (vbsh) and PostAuto. The closest bus stops in walking distance to the waterfall are Neuhausen Zentrum (Neuhausen Central) and Schloss Laufen, Rheinfall. 

As of December 2022, the following services exist from/to railway stations near the Rhine Falls:

Train 
InterCity (IC) (combined hourly service):
From/to Schaffhausen:  / IC 87: two-hourly service between Zürich HB and 

RegioExpress (RE) / Interregio-Express (IRE):

Zürich S-Bahn:
The S12 continues from Winterthur to 

:

St. Gallen S-Bahn:

Bus 

 (vbsh) lines:

Trolley bus line 1 of vbsh (direction: Herbstäcker) is the most direct bus service between Schaffhausen railway station and the Rhine Falls.
1: every 10 minutes between Waldfriedhof and Herbstäcker (via ), calling at bus stops Neuhausen Zentrum and Neuhausen, Kreuzstrasse (near Badischer Bahnhof)

PostAuto lines:

Boat 
During warmer seasons, frequent boat trips are offered from the Rhine Falls basin to one of the rocks in the middle of the waterfall (Rheinfallfelsen).

Frequent bus services (vbsh lines 6, 8, 25) are offered between Schifflände and Schaffhausen railway station.

Private transport 
The Rhine Falls are easily accessible by car, coach, or bicycle. Large pay-parking lots are located on both sides of the Rhine Falls. The nearest exits on the A4 motorway are Uhwiesen, Flurlingen or Schaffhausen Süd.

History 
Tourists have been awed by the Rhine Falls for centuries. In the 19th century, the painter J. M. W. Turner made several studies and larger paintings of the falls, and the lyrical poet Eduard Mörike wrote of the falls:

Halte dein Herz, o Wanderer, fest in gewaltigen Händen!
   Mir entstürzte vor Lust zitternd das meinige fast.
Rastlos donnernde Massen auf donnernde Massen geworfen,
   Ohr und Auge, wohin retten sie sich im Tumult?

(Hold your heart, oh traveller, tightly in mighty hands!
Mine nearly collapsed, shivering with pleasure.
Restlessly thundering masses thrown upon thundering masses,
Ear and eye, whither can they save themselves in such an uproar?)

In 1840, author Mary Shelley visited the Falls while on a tour of Europe with her son. She described her visit in a travel narrative that she published in 1844, Rambles in Germany and Italy. She says: "A portion of the cataract arches over the lowest platform, and the spray fell thickly on us, as standing on it and looking up, we saw wave, and rock, and cloud, and the clear heavens through its glittering ever-moving veil. This was a new sight, exceeding anything I had ever before seen; however, not to be wet through, I was obliged quickly to tear myself away.".

Gallery

See also
List of waterfalls by flow rate

References

External links

 
old pictures of the Rheinfall

Waterfalls of Switzerland
Tourist attractions in Switzerland
Block waterfalls
Neuhausen am Rheinfall
WRhine Falls